Larissa de Macedo Machado (born March 30, 1993), known professionally as Anitta, is a Brazilian singer, songwriter, television host, and actress. She rose to national fame with the release of her single "Show das Poderosas" in 2013.

After achieving national commercial success with her debut profissional single "Meiga e Abusada" in 2012, she signed a recording contract with Warner Music Brazil in January 2013. In July of the same year, she released her self-titled debut album which produced four hit singles on local charts and was certified platinum. Her second studio album, Ritmo Perfeito (2014), also achieved a minor commercial success in the country, and was accompanied by the release of her first live album Meu Lugar, on the same day. In 2015, she released her third studio album entitled Bang, which was certified platinum and spawned four successful singles "Deixa Ele Sofrer", the title track "Bang", "Essa Mina é Louca" and "Cravo e Canela". The album played a crucial role on establishing her almost dominant position in Brazilian music charts.

Between 2016 and 2018, Anitta embarked on numerous collaborations with international artists such as Nile Rodgers, Maluma, Iggy Azalea, Major Lazer, Alesso and J Balvin, among others. In 2017, she released her first song in Spanish language "Paradinha", which catapulted her partial transition to Spanish-language Latin pop and reggaeton music. Her collaboration on the same year with Colombian singer J Balvin, "Downtown", became her breakthrough song in several Spanish-speaking markets. In 2019, she joined several collaborations with artists such as Madonna, Sofía Reyes, Rita Ora, Luis Fonsi, Ozuna and Black Eyed Peas. She later received critical acclaim for her trilingual fourth studio visual album, Kisses (2019), which earned her a nomination for the Latin Grammy Award for Best Urban Music Album. Three months after, her Spanish language single "Envolver" released on late 2021, from her fifth studio album Versions of Me (2022), topped the Global Top 50 chart on Spotify, making Anitta the first Brazilian and Latin American artist with a solo song to do so. Anitta still ranked 1st on Billboard Global Excl. U.S. chart and 2nd on Billboard Global, being the first Brazilian artist to lead a global music chart.

Anitta was named by the Associação Paulista de Críticos de Arte (APCA) as the revelation of the year in music in 2013. She has received numerous accolades and several nominations at the Latin Grammy Awards, Latin American Music Awards, Billboard Latin Music Awards and Premios Lo Nuestro awards. Anitta has won seven MTV Europe Music Awards, and became the first Brazilian artist to win the award for Best Latin American Act. In 2017, she was ranked as one of the most influential celebrities in social media according to Billboard. In 2022, Anitta became the first Brazilian artist to win a MTV Video Music Awards category and an American Music Award. She was also the first Brazilian to make a performance on the two shows. Obtaining several international certifications for sales and several nominations in various awards around the world, Anitta received a Grammy nomination for the first time in the main categories as Best New Artist at the 2023 Grammy Awards.

Early life
Anitta was born and raised in Honório Gurgel neighborhood, a region with one of the lowest HDIs in the Rio de Janeiro city, the youngest daughter of Míriam Macedo and Mauro Machado; her brother Renan Machado currently acts as one of her music producers and jointly manages her career. Larissa had a poor childhood and was raised by divorced parents, with her mother gaining custody.

She began her singing career at the age of 8 when, after the insistence of her maternal grandparents, she started singing in the choir of the Santa Luzia's Parish, located in her neighborhood. At age 11, she took her first English classes and was already showing signs of pursuing an academic career and demonstrated above-average intelligence. She later received free dance lessons provided by her mother's teacher. When she was in high school, she finished a technical course in public administration after graduating from one of the most prestigious public schools in the country, the Dom Pedro II School. A year later, she decided to pursue an artistic career. That same year, she was the winner of the "Best New Artist" award given by the Associação Paulista de Críticos de Arte, as the main body of culture in Brazil.

Anitta's stage name was inspired by the character Anita, from the book Presença de Anita adapted as a teleseries by Rede Globo in 2001. She thought the character "amazing" because "[she] could be sexy without looking vulgar; girl and woman at the same time".

Anitta is a polyglot. In addition to her native language, Portuguese, she speaks English and Spanish fluently. She also has an advanced level of Italian and an intermediate level of French. Furthermore, she has taken Japanese classes and plans to learn Korean.

Career

2012–2013: Debut album and initial success
Anitta's career as a professional singer started by chance in 2010, when she was introduced to the
funk carioca producer Renato Azevedo (known as Batutinha). She was invited to record some demo tapes for him, as he had seen some of her home videos on YouTube. After being approved, she was nominated to sign a contract with the independent and specialized label in funk, Furacão 2000. Some time latter, she released her first single "Eu Vou Ficar", which was played to exhaustion on local radio stations in Rio de Janeiro and the song was included on the series "Armagedom", which included other artists from the musical niche.Advised by her producer, she decided to put another "t" in the stage name and the and the acronym MC. A year later, the song "Fica Só Olhando" was included on the second version of the collection.

Her first televised appearance was on May 16, 2012, on TV program Cante se Puder, on SBT, where she sang the single "Extravasa", a song recorded by axé music singer,Claudia Leitte, inside a beer cup. In June 2012,she chose to not renew the Furacão 2000 contract and signed with K2L Entertainment office.

In January 2013, Anitta signed a big recording contract with Warner Music Group and released the single Meiga e Abusada. The song exploded after being added to the telenovela Amor à Vida soundtrack and became one of the most requested songs in Brazilian radio stations in early 2013. A music video for the song was recorded in Las Vegas, and directed by American director Blake Farber. The song was chosen as lead single of her self-titled debut album was released in June 2013.

The song "Show das Poderosas" received considerable attention by the media in May 2013, becoming the most watched music video on YouTube in Brazil, surpassing 160 million views in less than a week after the release.The impact also helped to music on charts, which remained for weeks at the top of the best selling in iTunes Brazil, and making it the third most played song on the radio in the country during 2013. At the time, with that, the singer's fee per presentation increased to US$10.000

2014–2015: Meu Lugar and Ritmo Perfeito

Anitta announced in 2013 that she would start her first big national tour on that year and in some special shows she will record her first live CD.
The sales to the tickets for the special series of shows, went on sale in November 2013. The event took place in Rio de Janeiro at HSBC Arena on February 15, 2014, and was attended by about 10,000 people. The album was previously titled Fantástico Mundo de Anitta (Anitta's World), but was later renamed to Meu Lugar (My Place),after the release of the song "Quem Sabe" on iTunes. The song "Blá Blá Blá" was released as the lead single from the album on March 23, 2014. Despite the success in minor proportions,the song reached the number two on the Hot 100 Airplay chart in Brazil. The album was released on June 4, 2014, just a day after the release of her second studio album, Ritmo Perfeito.

The second single from the project was a song featuring rapper Projota titled "Cobertor", which reached a discret number 43 on Brazilian charts. The following single "Na Batida" was released on 31 July 2014. Its music video reached 1 million views on YouTube after just 24 hours. The single had a minor success on charts, peaking at number four on the Hot 100 Airplay chart. Other singles released from the album were "Ritmo Perfeito" and "No Meu Talento", featuring MC Guimê. In April 2014, she made her acting debut as Helena Boccato on comedy film Copa de Elite. In August 2014, she founded her own management company, Rodamoinho Produções Artísticas. In December, she also starred as goddess Solaris on television film Didi e o Segredo dos Anjos.

2015–2016: Bang and collaborations

Her third studio album Bang was released in October 2015. It was elected by Billboard Brasil as one of the most anticipated albums of the year. Its album cover art was signed by Giovanni Bianco, the same author of some most know taken photos by the American singer Madonna. Bang debuted at number three on the Brazilian albums chart with 40,000 copies sold at its first week. The album's sold 300,000 copies as of May 2016, surpassing sales of her debut album, which has sold 170,000 copies. It was also certified Platinum by the Associação Brasileira de Produtores de Discos (ABPD). The first single of the album, "Deixa Ele Sofrer", which was released on July 16, 2015, and reached the top of the iTunes Brazil chart. The song also made Anitta the first Brazilian singer to occupy the top of Spotify Brazil.

The album lead single, "Bang", was her first international success, staying at number one on iTunes and Spotify for several days, and its music video becoming an international viral video and receiving over 320 million views on YouTube. Other singles released from the album were "Essa Mina É Louca" and "Cravo e Canela". In October 2015, the artist won the EMA Worldwide Act Latin America, being the first Brazilian artist to win the award. A collaboration with Jota Quest and Nile Rodgers, entitled "Blecaute", was released in November 2015.

In 2016, Anitta made her debut as a TV hostess,leading the third season of cable television channel Multishow show Música Boa Ao Vivo(Good Music:Live). The singer was also featured on a remix of the song "Ginza", by singer J Balvin. In August 2016, she released a single titled "Sim ou Não" featuring Colombian singer Maluma, and performed at the 2016 Summer Olympics opening ceremony along with world know Brazilian singers and composers Caetano Veloso and Gilberto Gil. The next month, she signed her first international contract with talent agency William Morris Endeavor. In November 2016, she won the Best Brazilian Act category at the 2016 MTV Europe Music Awards.

Also in 2016, Bang was added to the annual video game series Just Dance 2017, as one of more than 40 tracks. On October 25, 2016, Ubisoft Brazil shot a flash mob in Avenida Paulista (São Paulo), where many people danced to the routine of the game in order to promote the new instalment of the series. Ubisoft also promoted an exclusive pocket show with the singer for the release of the game. There, the singer sang and danced  her track in game as demonstration. Meanwhile, she gave a lot of interviews, talking about her song was added the game soundtrack. and the song was selected for the digital qualifications of 2016 Just Dance World Championship.

2017–2018: Checkmate, Solo, international success and collaborations

In January 2017, the singer was featured on singles including "Loka", by female duo Simone & Simaria, and featured on single "Você Partiu Meu Coração",recorded by Nego do Borel and featured Wesley Safadão. In May 2017, "Switch", a collaboration with Australian rapper Iggy Azalea, became her first single in English to be released. The same month, she released a single in both Portuguese and Spanish titled "Paradinha". In June of the same year, the American group Major Lazer released "Sua Cara", along with her and drag queen singer Pabllo Vittar. The song is part of the band's fourth EP, Know No Better. In a matter of a few hours, the video exceeded the mark of 5 million views on YouTube. After its release, the song became an international hit, appearing as one hundred most played in Global Spotify, and spent more than five weeks on Billboard's Dance/Electronic Songs chart, making it the first Portuguese-language song to feature on that respective chart. The music video was also a hit, reaching more than 20 million views in one day.

On September 3, Anitta released her first English-language single "Will I See You", a collaboration with Grammy award-winning producer and songwriter Poo Bear. It was the first song of the singer's project entitled CheckMate, in which she would release a new song a month. On October 13, in partnership with Swedish DJ Alesso, Anitta released the second song from CheckMate, titled "Is That for Me". On November 19, the singer released, in her second collaboration with J Balvin, another track from the CheckMate project, "Downtown". The composition became an international success, entering in the "Top 50 Global", list of the 50 most executed songs in the world, making Anitta the first Brazilian to appear in the ranking. On December 18, 2017, Anitta released a new single, "Vai Malandra", featuring MC Zaac, Maejor, Tropkillaz and DJ Yuri Martins; this was the fourth and last song from the CheckMate project.

In January 2018, another collaboration with J Balvin, "Machika", was released. Two months later, she released another single in Spanish, titled "Indecente". In April, she debuted her new TV show on Multishow titled Anitta Entrou no Grupo. In June, she performed at Rock in Rio festival in Lisbon. She also made concerts in nightclubs in Paris and London as part of the Made in Brazil tour. The same month, she released a single titled "Medicina". "Medicina" featured her for the second time in the Just Dance series with two exclusive routines for the same track. The latest one was presented at Just Dance 2019 World Cup in Brasil. In September, she was featured on a single by production duo Seakret, "Perdendo a Mão", featuring Jojo Maronttinni. Later that same month, she debuted as one of the coaches on La Voz... México. The next month, she was featured on Colombian singer Greeicy Rendón's single "Jacuzzi". In November, Anitta released a multilingual extended play (EP) titled Solo, which has three songs in different languages, among them "Veneno" and "Não Perco Meu Tempo". Anitta also announced that all songs on the EP would have their respective music videos, which were released simultaneously on the same date as the EP and was the subject of a Shots Studios-produced docu-series titled Vai Anitta, which aired on Netflix.

2019–2020: Kisses and Brasileirinha 

The year 2019, in Anitta's career, was marked by musical partnerships and participation in tracks by other singers.

In February 2019, the artist released five songs: "Terremoto" (whose music video is based on "I'm Still in Love with You" by Sean Paul.) with Kevinho; "Bola Rebola" (single similar to "Vai Malandra") with Tropkillaz, J Balvin and MC Zaac; a re-recording of "Zé do Caroço" with producers Jetlag; "Te Lo Dije" with Natti Natasha and "Favela Chegou" with Ludmilla. On March 15, the song "R.I.P." Mexican Sofía Reyes with participation of Brazilian and British Rita Ora.

On April 5, the singer's fourth studio album, entitled Kisses, was released. It was her first visual and trilingual album. In the United States, the album reached the fourth position on the Latin Pop Albums and number 16 on the Top Latin Albums charts. In Spain, the album reached forty-sixth position on the PROMUSICAE list. The album's lead single, "Poquito", with American rapper Swae Lee, was released in conjunction with the album.

Anitta is present in the soundtrack of the film UglyDolls that was released in April of the same year. The singer appears on the track "Ugly" which was recorded in three languages: English, Spanish and Portuguese. On June 14 Madonna launches Madame X, where Anitta participates in the track Faz Gostoso, a re-recording by Portuguese singer Blaya.

Anitta again partnered with Major Lazer, - the first in 2017 on the song "Sua Cara" - this time on "Make It Hot", a track released on June 19 and featured on the group's Music Is the Weapon album. On June 21, the song "Pa 'lante" was released along with Alex Sensation and Luis Fonsi. On July 11, "Muito Calor" was launched, a partnership between Anitta and the singer Ozuna. The song was part of the singer's third studio album, entitled Nibiru, but was removed for reasons that have not been clarified. On September 6, the partnership between Anitta and Léo Santana, "Contatinho", was launched. The song was recorded live, as the opening song of Léo Santana's DVD, called Levada do Gigante. Still in September, on the 30th, together with the group Black Eyed Peas, they released the single "Explosion". In the same month, Anitta signed with Skol Beats to become the brand's head of creativity and innovation.

On October 4, she collaborated with the singer Vitão, "Complicado". Anitta recorded the song "Pantera" for the soundtrack to the movie Charlie's Angels, released in October, the executive production of the soundtrack was written by Ariana Grande. In the same month, the artist started the Brasileirinha project, which had released songs in Portuguese only until December. The first single released was the song "Some Que Ele Vem Atrás" in partnership with the singer Marília Mendonça, the music video was recorded live during the 26th edition of the Brazilian Music Multishow Award. "Combatchy" was released in November as a second single, the song features singers Lexa, Luísa Sonza and MC Rebecca. On November 23, she participated in the opening show of the Copa Libertadores de América Final that took place in Peru alongside Colombian singer Sebástian Yatra and Argentine singers Fito Páez and Tini, performing the song "Y Dale Alegría A Mi Corazón". The third single from the Brasileirinha project, "Meu Mel", in partnership with the trio Melim, was released on December 13; "Até o Céu", a duet with MC Cabelinho and the last track of the project, was made available on December 20.

In January 2020, she released the single "Jogação" with the band Psirico. The music video for the song was recorded live during "Ensaios da Anitta", a show that took place at Espaço das Américas, in São Paulo. The following month, the singer released the song "Rave de Favela" in partnership with the Brazilian singer MC Lan and the American group Major Lazer. Anitta also participated in the songs "Contando Lunares" by Spanish singer Don Patricio, "Joga Sua Potranca" by Brazilian DJ Gabriel do Borel and "Dança Assim" by Angolan musician Preto Show. Still in February, the singer participated in four episodes of the telenovela Amor de Mãe on TV Globo, playing Sabrina, a fan of the character Ryan (Thiago Martins), who ends up getting involved with him. During the social isolation due to the pandemic of COVID-19, Anitta premiered in May directly from her home the program Anitta Dentro da Casinha, broadcast by the channel Multishow. Anitta prepares her first album all in English (the fifth overall), after the trilingual bet on Kisses (2019). The singer confirmed that she has thirty songs ready and is currently selecting the tracks that will make her album, along with American businessman Brandon Silverstein. Ryan Tedder, lead singer of the band OneRepublic worked on the executive production of the disc, he is known for having worked on songs with Adele, Beyoncé, Bruno Mars, among others. In an interview with Veja magazine, he said: "She understands the global culture and is prepared for the American market. Everyone in Los Angeles and New York wants to work with Anitta". The information on the new album had been circulated on the internet in a post in the singer's biography on the website of S10 Entertainment, Silverstein's company, but after the news spread to the singer's fans the information was removed from the site.

In June 2020, Anitta signed a recording contract with Warner Records in the U.S., ahead of her U.S. debut album expected to release later in 2020. The album will be executive produced by Ryan Tedder.

In August 2020, Anitta released her first single in Italy with Fred de Palma, "Paloma" which became one of the most shamaz'ed songs of the month in the country, and becoming the song by a Brazilian artist in the highest position on the Italian charts. In August 2020 she was also featured on WC No Beat's album on a track called "Cena de Novela" alongside Djonga & PK and also featured on the trap song "Tá Com o Papato" of Papatinho with Dfideliz & BIN.

On September 18, 2020, Anitta began a new phase in her international career, releasing "Me Gusta" in collaboration with Cardi B and Myke Towers. The song reached the 14th position on the iTunes chart in the United States and 32 on Spotify United States. Additionally, the song debuted with over 2 million plays in the top 200 in 38 countries on Spotify and 87 countries on Apple Music, as well as on the global charts of both platforms at 24 and 90, respectively. Furthermore, the song debuted on various Billboard charts. "Me Gusta" became Anitta's first entry on the Billboard Hot 100.  In September 2020, Anitta questioned Google about the meaning of the word "Patroa" in Portuguese, as following Google's previous definition the word meant that "Patrão" (Masculine) was the owner or boss, while the word "Patroa" (Feminine) was defined as the boss's wife. The singer thus managed to get the University of Oxford to change the definition of the word in the dictionary and how it was displayed in Google searches.

2021–2022: Versions of Me and International recognition and success 

In March 2021, Anitta and Maluma were part of the Remix of "Mi Niña" with Wisin, Myke Towers and Los Legendarios.

On April 14, 2021, Anitta joined Wisin, Maluma and Myke Towers and opened the Latin American Music Awards with the remix of "Mi Niña".  In May, the Latin Grammy organized the event "Ellas y su Musica", which seeks to honor women in the world of Latin music, Anitta performed "Girl from Rio". In May, Anitta together with Puerto Rican singer and rapper Lunay released the song "Todo o Nada". The song entered the top 100 of all Latin American countries and Spain, top 50 in 5 countries, having several highlights on the Billboard charts as well.

In June 2021, Anitta released her first single in France with Dadju, "Mon Soleil", The song became one of the most heard songs on the French-speaking charts, becoming the highest position by a Brazilian artist. The song earned Anitta two nominations in the main categories at the NRJ Music Awards. In June 2021, Anitta released her second single in Italian with Fred de Palma, "Un Altro Ballo". The partnership became one of the most heard songs on the Italian charts, just not surpassing the success of its first single in the country. Also in June 2021, the singer joined the board of directors of startup Nubank.

In July 2021, in addition to performing and winning some awards at the Heat Latin Music Awards, Anitta was honored with a special recognition award for her contribution to female empowerment. Anitta and Lunay performed "Todo o Nada" on July 22, at Premios Juventud.

On September 11, Anitta performed several songs at the Triller Fight Club in Florida. In partnership with Burger King, Anitta performed "Girl from Rio" at the MTV Video Music Awards on September 12, in addition to winning her own commercial for her vegan hamburger in her name, which was widely publicized on American TV. Anitta appeared, for the first time, at the Met Gala 2021, in September alongside Brazilian entrepreneur in the footwear sector Alexandre Birman.

On October 18, 2021, Anitta joined Billie Eilish, BlackPink, Barack Obama, Pope Francisco, Jaden Smith and others for the YouTube Originals special that aims to raise awareness about climate change on the planet, Dear Earth. The singer performed her single "Girl from Rio". In September, alongside Charli XCX, Anitta joined as a mentor in the singing competition held by Billboard and Samsung Galaxy, Billboard NXT.

On November 14, Anitta made a surprise appearance at the MTV Europe Music Awards, talking to host Saweetie. In November 2021, Anitta performed the opening performance of the Latin Grammy alongside Gloria Estefan and Carlinhos Brown. Alongside Jeremy Scott and dressed as Moschino, Anitta attended the amfAR benefit gala in November.

Anitta was one of the guests at the Community Organized Relief Effort (CORE) charity event, created by actor Sean Penn, in addition to performing some songs, she also auctioned off an experience with her at her shows at the Brazilian Carnival, where the winning bid was 110,000 dollars.

On December 9, alongside Pedro Sampaio, she participated in the single "No Chão Novinha". The song debuted in the top 10 on the Brazilian chart, Top 30 on the Portuguese chart and Top 170 on the Global charts. In December, Anitta attended the Variety 2021 Music Hitmakers Brunch and handed the Crossover Award to Kali Uchis. Anitta, Saweetie, Jack Harlow and 24kGoldn were some of the performers at Miley's New Year's Eve Party, hosted by Miley Cyrus and Pete Davidson, on December 31, 2021.

Anitta was part of the soundtrack of Fast and Furious 9 with the song "Furiosa" and Sing 2, with the song "Suéltate" featuring Sam i, BIA & Jarina De Marco.

On January 3, 2022, it was announced that Anitta had signed a worldwide publishing agreement with Sony Music Publishing. Her Spanish single "Envolver" released by late 2021, topped the Global Top 50 on Spotify in March 2022, making Anitta the first Brazilian artist and the first Latin artist with a solo song to do so. It also become the most streamed song in a single-day in 2022 (7.278 million) at the time. Anitta still reached the top on Deezer Global and YouTube Global. "Envolver" even managed to top the Billboard Global Excl. U.S. becoming the first Latin woman to do so with a solo song, she still remained at number two on the Billboard Global 200. Still with "Envolver" Anitta got several entries on the Billboard charts, one of the main ones being her second entry on the Hot 100, first solo entry, the song became the third highest entry of a Latin solo song on the chart, behind only "Telepatía" by Kali Uchis and "Provenza" by Karol G both at 25, making it the second-highest solo song entry entirely in Spanish by a Latin female artist. The song received praise from the international press and entered several "best of the year" lists, such as the Los Angeles Times, Billboard and more. Rolling Stones magazine named the song the 81st best reggaeton song of all time. In February 2022, Anitta performed at Premios Lo Nuestro along with Justin Quiles the remix version of "Envolver", in addition to "No Chão Novinha".

On March 26, she took the Lollapalooza Brazil main stage alongside Miley Cyrus and performed together the single "Boys Don't Cry" the live version became a track for the deluxe version of the album Attentions: Miley Live. On March 31, 2022, Anitta announced her fifth studio and second multilingual album, Versions of Me, would be released on April 12. Ryan Tedder executive produced the album. The singles "Me Gusta" (featuring Cardi B and Myke Towers), "Girl from Rio", "Faking Love" (featuring Saweetie), "Envolver", and "Boys Don't Cry" preceded the album. Becoming the first Brazilian pop album to reach the mark of 1 billion streams on Spotify. The album reached the highest debut by a Brazilian artist on iTunes, Apple Music and Spotify in the United States,the album was the most streamed in the world on its debut on Spotify Global upon its release, in addition to being the third-highest debut on Spotify in the United States. Versions of Me broke the record for the biggest Spotify debut by a Brazilian artist in the platform's history with over 9.1 million streams. In addition, the album surpassed the debut of Camila Cabello's new album, Familia, also being the album by a Latin woman with the highest debut in 2022. Forbes, Rolling Stone, NME, Billboard and The Line of Best Fit were some of the portals that positively evaluated Versions of Me. In the same month of April, she became the first Brazilian to perform on the main stage of the Coachella festival. In the same month, she got her first nomination at the MTV Video Music Awards for "Envolver" in the "Best Latin" category; a main show performance was also confirmed. By popular vote, the song won the category, making Anitta the first female solo artist to receive the award. Anitta also became the first artist from Brazil to perform and win an American Music Awards.

On May 5, 2022, Anitta was the female lead in the music video for "First Class", by rapper Jack Harlow. On May 13, 2022, Anitta was one of the international guests at the first Billboard MusicCon where she spoke with other artists on topics such as the evolution of the music scene in genres and cultures, women in music, among other related topics, she also performed several songs in the event. On May 15, she and Michael Bublé were one of the presenters at the Billboard Music Awards. Dressed by the Italian brand Moschino, led by creative director Jeremy Scott, Anitta attended, for her second time, the annual Met Gala 2022 ball, in May.

On June 2, 2022, she was awarded a wax figure at Madame Tussauds in New York, the first Brazilian singer to appear in the museum. Still in June 2022, Anitta started a promotional tour at the main music festivals in Europe. Anitta started the series of concerts in Spain and ended with a super concert in Portugal. The promotional tour went through nine European countries (Spain, Ireland, Portugal, Denmark, Sweden, Holland, Switzerland, Italy and France). The show in Poland was canceled due to the ongoing war between Russia and Ukraine. On June 18, Anitta performed in one of the largest stadiums in France, Le Parc de Princes , in Paris for an audience of more than 50 thousand people together with Dadju, with the song "Mon Soleil". On June 23, she gave interviews in French territory for NRJ Hit Music Only and for the Quotidien program, in addition to performing "Envolver".

On July 6, 2022, Argentine singer Tini released "La Loto", a collaboration with Anitta and American singer Becky G, which served as the seventh single from Tini's upcoming fourth album. The song became Anitta's highest peak on the Billboard Hot 100 Argentina, at number seven. On July 8, 2022, the song on "No Más" was released in collaboration with Murda Beatz, J Balvin, Quavo and Pharrell. The song became the best position for a Brazilian artist in the history of iTunes in the United States, at 4th position, it also reached the first position on Amazon Best Sellers in the United States and its highest position on Deezer US in 14th, in addition to reaching the first position on Billboard Rap Digital Song Sales and the 13th on the Billboard Digital Song Sales.

In August 2022, Anitta released the deluxe version of Versions of Me, which featured collaborations with Maluma, "El Que Espera", and Missy Elliot, "Lobby, in addition to the trilingual version of "Dançarina Remix" with Pedro Sampaio, Dadju, Nicky Jam and MC Pedrinho. "Dançarina Remix" reached number 11 on the France Single Charts, Anitta's second highest position, behind only "Mon Soleil" number eight, and becoming Anitta's song with the most days in the top 50 on Spotify France, in addition to receiving a platinum certificate in French territory, also reaching first place on the French Shazam. "Lobby" earned Anitta her first entry on Japan's largest streaming platform, Line Music, making her the first artist from Brazil to achieve this milestone.

On October 28, 2022, the Black Eyed Peas released "Simply the Best" the opening track and the second single from their album "Elevation", a collaboration with Anitta and El Alfa. In November 2022, in addition to being nominated in two categories at the Latin Grammy Awards, Anitta also performed a performance of "Envolver" and a Funk Dance Medley, she was also one of the hosts of the night. In November, she still performed at Rihanna's Savage X Fenty Show. Anitta was listed by Forbes 30 Under 30 North America 2023, in the music category, as one of the leaders of the next generation of Latin American music. The list aims to recognize artists who make a significant contribution to the world's recording industry. After successful releases, nominations for dozens of world awards and accomplishments achieved throughout the year, she was nominated for the 2023 Grammy Awards in the Best New Artist category.

On November 2, Anitta joined Lil Nas X, BTS and Tyler the Creator and was honored with the WSJ Magazine Innovator Awards 2022, held by The Wall Street Journal, which honors visionaries in various areas of entertainment. In November, she performed at the Los 40 Music Awards, becoming one of the most talked about subjects in Spain due to her performance of "Envolver". On November 15, 2022, Anitta released a version of "Practice" ("Prooshtis" in the game's language) entirely in Simlish, for The Sims Sessions global campaign in The Sims 4, thus being the sixth language in which she sings. On November 30, Anitta released her third EP, À procura da Anitta perfeita, on the Warner Music Brasil label. It is Anitta's first project entirely in Portuguese since the album Bang!. The EP was leaked ahead of time, some songs were made available on some digital platforms, without prior disclosure and by surprise. All songs debuted in the top 60 of Spotify Brazil and Portugal, with approximately 2 million streams in 24 hours.

On December 18, she performed at iHeartradio y100's Jingle Ball at the FLA Live Arena. On December 27, 2022, Guinness World Records chose to highlight the top six music artists of 2022, Anitta joined Taylor Swift, BTS, Harry Styles, Billie Eilish, Adele and were named in a list of 2022's Iconic Record Breakers.

2023–present: Acting 
On January18, 2023, drag queen Gloria Groove released the song "Proibidona" in partnership with Anitta and Valesca Popozuda, which debuted in the top 28 on Spotify Brazil and at 142 on Spotify Portugal, with over 510,000 streams. The song also entered iTunes in various countries, such as Brazil, Portugal, Luxembourg, Turkey, United Arab Emirates, Sweden, and Denmark. On January 20, Anitta won the "Best Global Act" award at the All Africa Music Awards, the largest award ceremony in the African continent. This achievement made her the first Latin artist to receive this honor. On January 23, Anitta received 6 nominations at Lo Nuestro Awards, one of the most important Latin music awards. Furthermore, Anitta also became an ambassador for Lay's on January 17, one of the most well-known snack brands in the world. She starred in a post-Super Bowl TV spot for the "Beat of Joy" campaign, which featured a remix of the song "Envolver" recorded in a studio powered by electricity from more than 6,000 potatoes. This campaign set a Guinness World Record. 

On February 8, 2023, the Brazilian drag queen Pabllo Vittar released her fifth studio album entitled Noitada, featuring the participation of singer Anitta on the tracks "Balinha de Coração" and "Calma Amiga", both songs debuted in the top 50 of Spotify Brazil, 26 and 41 respectively. On February 18, 2023, Anitta achieved her 43rd top 10 entry on the Spotify Brazil charts and her 34th entry on Spotify Global charts, with the song "Ai Papai".

On March 2, Anitta was elected by Variety magazine as the seventh most impactful international woman of 2023, being the only Brazilian artist on the list. On March 8, Anitta was once again highlighted by international media, being elected by Bloomberg Línea  as one of the women with the most impact in 2023, alongside names like Shakira, Karol G and others. This honor reinforces the relevance and commitment of the artist to themes such as female empowerment and diversity, as well as highlighting her artistic talent. On March 9,she was confirmed as part of the cast of the seventh season of the popular Spanish Netflix series, Élite. On March 12, Anitta and Jão released their first collaboration, "Pilantra", which debuted at the top of all streaming platforms in Brazil, occupying the 1st position in iTunes, Youtube, Apple Music and the 4th position on Spotify Brazil and the 61st position in Portugal. The song also achieved the highest debut of a pop song on the Spotify Brazil Charts in 2023, with 1,162,003 streams. With this, Anitta reached her 34th entry in the top 5 most listened-to songs in Brazil. On March 13, the singer received two nominations at the Latin American Music Awards.

Artistry

Musical style

Anitta's music is generally pop, funk carioca, funk melody and Latin pop, but she also incorporates R&B, dance-pop, electropop, EDM, reggae, and reggaeton. In addition to having songs in five different languages ​​in her discography, such as Portuguese, Spanish, English, Italian (Paloma and Un Altro Ballo ) and French (Mon Soleil ).

Influences
Anitta cites as her greatest influences the singers  Mariah Carey, Beyoncé, Shakira and Rihanna.

During the production of her second album, Anitta quoted Katy Perry as influencing the new tracks. Other references cited by the singer also include the group Pussycat Dolls, and such singers as Madonna, Britney Spears, Kate Nash and Colbie Caillat. Among Brazilian pop artists, she was influenced by girl group Rouge. During an interview for the G1, Anitta mentioned the MPB singers Gal Costa and Caetano Veloso for always being renewed and risking themselves in other styles.

For The Line of Best Fit she revealed nine songs that inspired her. Among the artists she cited Mariah Carey, Luis Miguel, Beyoncé, Sean Paul, Nina Simone, CeCe Peniston, Flyleaf, Belle and Sebastian, Funk Como Le Gusta and Selena.

Public image

Soon after reaching stardom, Anitta was described as a sex symbol by the media. In 2015, she was voted the sexiest woman by VIP magazine readers. She believes that by working "with the sensuality thing", her artwork is not taken seriously by a part of the critics and the public. The singer expressed her frustration by saying, "[...] people think you have no talent, no intelligence. I can be intelligent and have the will to be sensual."

When she was elected "Woman of the Year" by the Brazilian edition of GQ magazine in 2017, she made a feminist speech. She was vocal about how different is the treatment for female artists.

The singer was listed by Vogue magazine as one of the 100 most influential and creative people in the world. Anitta was chosen for the ranking because of her "positivity engagement around the body illustrated by the affirmative choice to display her untold image in the "Vai Malandra" music video.

Anitta is one of the most influential celebrities in social networks. In June 2017, it appeared in the Social 50 ranking of the North American Billboard like the 7th most influential artist of the world in the social networks, repeating, among other times, its appearance in December, when it was in the tenth position. In March 2018, she won the iHeart Music Awards in the Social Star category.

Anitta is an ambiental (environmental) activist and is actively vocal about the crimes committed against the Amazon forest and its native indigenous population.

During the 2018 Brazilian elections, the singer publicly posted a video for the #EleNão (#NotHim) campaign, against leading Brazilian presidential candidate Jair Bolsonaro. Since then she's been vocal against him and his government.

After achieving success, Anitta associated its image with several brands. Often referred to as a "marketing case," Anitta said she feels praised when she is described as such. She explained: "I'm happy when I see people believe that I'm a marketing case because I'm the one who does my marketing. I studied marketing, I graduated in pre-college administration, I had a marketing class, all my marketing I'm the one who plans, I do it, I feel praised when I see people saying that." She also described as" co-branding "her strategy of partnering with foreign artists to lead their work to other markets.

Anitta wore more colorful printed dresses early in her career, with cropped top combinations, short jeans and plaid blouses and caps. After the release of the album Bang (2015), the style of the singer began to make references to pop art. She has already stated that she likes to wear clothes from the brands Moschino and Givenchy. In an interview with EGO.com, she said, "Being stylish is having an attitude, having an uncommon sense of being authentic, having style is having a good mood."

Legacy and impact 
Anitta is the biggest pop star in Brazil in years, and is the Brazilian artist with the greatest international exposure, referenced by several magazines, renowned websites, and even by the Grammy, as the Queen of Brazilian Pop. Additionally, she has become one of the most acclaimed Latin artists in recent memory. The singer was elected in 2018 by Billboard as the 7th most influential artist in the world, on the Billboard Social 50 list, which listed the 50 most influential artists on social networks. In 2022 she won the recognition award for her cultural impact and for being the ambassador of Brazilian music at the WSJ. Magazine. The singer is cited several times as the "First Brazilian", as she is always opening doors that no artist born in Brazil has ever crossed. She is often cited as the biggest name in Brazilian funk and pop today, being the exponent of the rhythm to the world, being credited by Billboard as being responsible for the Latin Grammy to update what was understood as urban music and include Brazilian funk for the first time among the genres that make up the concept.

In addition to music, the singer became the third most influential personality in politics in Brazil, especially in 2022, behind former president Jair Bolsonaro and influencer Felipe Neto. Several news portals report that Anitta played a key role in putting pressure on politicians in votes on issues involving the environment, culture, racism and homophobia, being a direct enemy of Jair Bolsonaro. The singer, along with other artists, strengthened support for the rival candidate of former President Bolsonaro, then President Lula. Anitta's support came more precisely when encouraging young people aged 16 to 18 to obtain their electoral documents, the effect attracted more than 2 million teenagers, the youth enlistment campaign and the regularization of the electoral title led the Superior Electoral Court to register a record of registrations, of more than 8.5 million requests for assistance on the electoral situation.

In 2021 she was elected one of the most influential personalities in the world by Time, joining the 'Time 100 Next' list, which brings emerging names across the planet, in 2022 the singer was listed by Forbes 30 Under 30 North America, as one of the leaders of next generation of Latin American music.

The singer is also one of the biggest influences for modern marketing in Brazil's recent history.

Business and ventures

Products and advertisements 
In addition to being a poster girl, ambassador, Anitta is sponsored and has already made commercials for different brands, including Adidas, Samsung, Shein, Burger King, Elma Chips, Cheetos, Lays, Rexona, Tinder, Skol, Nubank, Claro, Bacardi, Estácio, Renault, C&A, iFood, Pepsi, Magazine Luiza, Target, Cadiveu, The Sims, Free Fire, Facebook Gaming, Brizza Arezzo, Sol de Janeiro, Hope, Tiffany & Co, among other brands.

In 2014, Anitta founded the Rodamoinho group, a holding company for music and entertainment with offices in Rio de Janeiro and Los Angeles. The holding has the companies, "Rodamoinho Entretenimento" which is specifically aimed at the production and realization of concerts, events and tours. "Rodamoinho Records" is a company dedicated to the music industry as a whole, which in addition to being a label and publisher, also carries out a survey of catalogs, registration of works, release and distribution of singles, EPs and albums, management and organization of the musical collection and commercial negotiation of use and synchronization. "Rodamoinho Filmes" is an audiovisual production company, responsible for the production, execution, and delivery of videoclips, lives, and films. Who is also responsible for the idealization and executive production of the cartoon based on the life of the singer, "Clube da Anittinha". And "Floresta Music & Touring" which is a company dedicated to the management and international publishing of Brazilian artists.

In September 2019, the singer became Head of Creativity and Innovation at Skol Beats, a brand of Ambev, one of the largest breweries in the world. Anitta has been active in the discussion of marketing strategy, business and innovations. The contract provides for the launch of an authorial product per year. Anitta launched, together with the antiperspirant brand Rexona, a new product line "Rexona by Anitta" in 2019. In November 2022, the singer now became the face of all Rexona 72h campaigns.

On January 16, 2021, the singer signed a partnership with the vegan product brand, Cadiveu Essentials, a repair line, which has five products for a hair care routine. Anitta, in addition to becoming the brand's poster girl, co-created the Vegan Repair products alongside the brand's product development team.

On June 21, 2021, Anitta was announced as a member of the board of directors of neobank Nubank, the largest fintech bank in Latin America, in addition to participating in the quarterly meetings with the company's board of directors to assist in strategic decisions about the future and improvement of the services offered by fintech to the most vulnerable classes. According to information from executives in interviews, the singer played a key role in convincing the board of the importance of listing the company on the Brazilian stock exchange, B3, along with the planned IPO in the United States. In addition to supporting the idea of the company offering free stock receipts, BDR, to its customer base. With this initiative, fintech gained more than 7.5 million partners. In August 2022, due to the growth of the singer's schedule, due to her global expansion, Anitta requested that her participation in the board not be renewed. She then became a global brand ambassador, as part of Nubank's marketing, the singer participated in Nubank's campaign as a sponsor of the 2022 World Cup.

On May 23, 2022, together with the educational institution Estácio, the singer launched the online course "Anitta Prepara", a course aimed at the area of entrepreneurship. Anitta provides mentoring and is supported by a team of professors from the higher education institution, all of whom specialize in entrepreneurship and innovation. On May 26, the singer was announced as a partner of the Brazilian foodtech focused on plant-based meats, Fazenda Futuro (or Future Farm, its brand in the U.S.). Anitta participates in the company's business management, in addition to working on innovation projects that will help the brand to spread the consumption of meat made from plants in Brazil and in other countries.

As a co-creator and in partnership with the pharmaceutical company Cimed, Anitta launched on July 28, 2022, the brand "Puzzy By Anitta", which is an intimate perfume without gender, with several fragrances inspired by the singer. The intimate perfume, dermatologically and gynecologically tested, approved by Anvisa, registered more than 400,000 units sold and the forecast is to close the first semester with a turnover of 50 million reais. The company also made the product available for international sale in the United States and Latin America, in addition to the promise to make it available in Europe, making "Puzzy by Anitta" the first Cimed product to be sold outside Brazil.

Personal life
Anitta is bisexual and identifies as part of the LGBTQ+ community. She dated Mr. Thug, the lead vocalist of Bonde da Stronda, from early 2011 until the end of 2012. The singer also had a relationship with her dancer Ohana Lefundes,  with the doctor Pamela Tosatti and with the actor and model Pablo Morais. On November 17, 2017, she married businessman Thiago Magalhães, with whom she had been in contact since May of the same year. The couple married under separation of property. They announced their divorce in September 2018. 
From June 2019, she was dating Pedro Scooby, until their breakup in August 2019. She also began dating Gabriel David in February 2020, but they broke up in April that year. One month later, she began dating television host Gui Araújo, until they broke up in June of that year. On June 12, 2022, Dia dos Namorados (Lovers' Day) in Brazil, Anitta revealed that she is dating Canadian record producer Murda Beatz, but they broke up 2 months later.

In an interview for Trip magazine in 2017, she stated that if she did not pursue her artistic career, she would "be a happy psychologist".

In January 2019, after watching the documentary Cowspiracy (2014), she started transitioning to veganism. PETA named her one of the Most Beautiful Vegan Celebrities of 2022, along with singer/songwriter Lenny Kravitz.

Discography

 Studio albums
 Anitta (2013)
 Ritmo Perfeito (2014)
 Bang! (2015)
 Kisses (2019)
 Versions of Me (2022)

Tours
 Turnê Show das Poderosas (2013–14)
 Turnê Meu Lugar (2014–16)
 Bang Tour (2016–17)
 Kisses Tour (2019-2020)
 Euro Summer Tour 2022 (2022)

Filmography
This is a chronologically ordered list of films and television shows in which Anitta has appeared.

Films

Series

Television

Awards and nominations 
Anitta has been nominated for numerous important awards throughout her career, in Brazil, throughout Latin America, North America, Europe, Asia and Africa, receiving over 650 nominations and winning over 270 awards. Among them are nominations for the biggest music awards such as the Grammy Awards, Latin Grammy Awards, American Music Awards, Latin American Music Awards, MTV Video Music Awards, MTV Europe Music Awards, MTV Millennial Awards, MTV Millennial Awards Brazil, All Africa Music Awards, NRJ Music Awards, Billboard Latin Music Awards, ASCAP Award, People's Choice Awards, WSJ. Magazine's Innovator Awards, APCA Trophy, GLAAD Media Award, Heat Latin Music Awards, iHeartRadio Music Awards, Latin Music Italian Awards, LOS40 Music Awards, Melhores do Ano, Meus Prêmios Nick, Multishow Brazilian Music Awards, Nickelodeon Kids' Choice Awards, Premios Juventud, Lo Nuestro Awards, Teen Choice Awards, Premios Tu Música Urbano, among others.

Anitta is one of the Brazilian/Latin singers with the most awards and nominations in the world, being the first Brazilian and Latin artist to win and be nominated for several of these awards.

References

External links

 
 

 
1993 births
Living people
21st-century Brazilian actresses
21st-century Brazilian businesspeople
21st-century Brazilian women singers
Hispanic and Latino American artists
Actresses from Rio de Janeiro (city)
Bisexual actresses
Bisexual feminists
Bisexual singers
Bisexual songwriters
Bisexual women
Brazilian women pop singers
Brazilian women singer-songwriters
Brazilian film actresses
Brazilian Latin pop singers
Brazilian television actresses
Brazilian women philanthropists
Brazilian Roman Catholics
Electropop musicians
English-language singers from Brazil
Feminist musicians
Funk carioca musicians
Latin music songwriters
Latin pop singers
Brazilian LGBT singers
Brazilian LGBT songwriters
MTV Europe Music Award winners
Musicians from Rio de Janeiro (city)
Reggaeton musicians
Spanish-language singers of Brazil
Urbano musicians
Warner Music Group artists
Writers from Rio de Janeiro (city)
Brazilian philanthropists
Warner Records artists
20th-century Brazilian LGBT people
21st-century Brazilian LGBT people
Women in Latin music
LGBT people in Latin music
Brazilian LGBT actors
Brazilian bisexual people